Conahy Shamrocks is a Gaelic Athletic Association club situated in the small parish of Conahy, in County Kilkenny, Ireland. The club was founded in 1886, and is therefore one of the oldest in the county. Conahy won the 2008 All-Ireland Junior Club Hurling Championship in Croke Park, defeating Moyle Rovers of Tipperary. Conahy club member, and then president of the GAA, Nickey Brennan presented the cup to his home club. The club won the All-Ireland Junior title again in 2020.

Achievements

 All-Ireland Junior Club Hurling Championship Winners 2008, 2020
 Leinster Junior Club Hurling Championship Winners 2008, 2019
 Kilkenny Intermediate Hurling Championship Winners (4) 1930, 1932, 1977, 1986
 Kilkenny Junior Hurling Championship Winners (3) 1976, 2007, 2019

Notable hurlers
 Karl Downey
 Nickey Brennan
 Kieran Brennan
 Canice Brennan
  Damo “cudbox” Cuddihy
 Robbie Dooley

References

External links
 Conahy Shamrocks GAA Club Web Site

Gaelic games clubs in County Kilkenny
Hurling clubs in County Kilkenny